Bo Gunnar Widerberg (8 June 1930 – 1 May 1997) was a Swedish film director, writer, editor and actor.

Biography

Early life
Widerberg was born in Malmö, Malmöhus County, Sweden.

Career
Widerberg was the director of films such as Raven's End (1963), Elvira Madigan (1967), Ådalen 31 (1969), Joe Hill (1971), Fimpen (1974), The Man on the Roof (1976), Victoria (1979), The Man from Majorca (1984), The Serpent's Way (1986) and All Things Fair (1995). The Serpent's Way was screened in the Un Certain Regard section at the 1987 Cannes Film Festival and in competition at the 15th Moscow International Film Festival. In 1966 at the 3rd Guldbagge Awards his film Heja Roland! won the award for Best Film.

Death and legacy
Widerberg died in Ängelholm, Sweden on 1 May 1997 of stomach cancer and was buried in the New Cemetery in Båstad. He had four children: Nina, Martin, Johan, and Matilda. Johan has become an actor and his son Martin became a director. As a child, Nina Widerberg acted in five of her father's films, including Barnvagnen and The Man on the Roof. Johan played Detective Kollberg's son in The Man on the Roof.

In conjunction with the City Tunnel in Malmö, a small plaza around the southern entrance to the train, named Bo Widerberg place, was inaugurated in 2010. The site is located near Widerberg's former residence in the city.

Awards
He won a Silver Bear prize at the 46th Berlin International Film Festival for All Things Fair and a Special Grand Jury Prize at the Cannes Festival for Ådalen 31. Raven's End, Ådalen 31 and All Things Fair all received a nominations for the Academy Award for Best Foreign Language Film. For Ådalen 31 Widerberg won the Guldbagge Award for Best Director at the 6th Guldbagge Awards. For The Man on the Roof he won the award for Best Film at the 13th Guldbagge Awards.

Selected filmography

Director
All Things Fair (1995)
Tagning Alla är äldre än jag ... (1994)
Efter föreställningen (1992)
Hebriana (1990)
The Wild Duck (1989)
En far (1988)
The Serpent's Way (1986)
The Man from Majorca (1984)
Tagning Rött och svart (1982)
Linje Lusta (1981)
Missförståndet (1981)
En handelsresandes död (1979)
Måsen (1979)
Victoria (1979)
The Man on the Roof (1976)
Stubby (1974)
Joe Hill (1971)
A Mother with Two Children Expecting Her Third (1970)
Ådalen 31 (1969)
The White Game (1968)
Elvira Madigan (1967)
Heja Roland! (1966)
Love 65 (1965)
Barnvagnen (English title 'Swedish Sin') (1963)
Raven's End (1963)
Pojken och draken (1962)

References

External links

1930 births
1997 deaths
Writers from Malmö
Deaths from cancer in Sweden
Deaths from stomach cancer
Swedish film directors
Swedish film editors
Swedish male screenwriters
Litteris et Artibus recipients
Best Director Guldbagge Award winners
20th-century Swedish male actors
20th-century Swedish screenwriters
20th-century Swedish male writers